This is a very incomplete list of Gaelic footballers who have played at senior level for the Tyrone county team.

List of players

A–L
 Peter Canavan
 Colm Cavanagh: 13 seasons, until 2020
 Seán Cavanagh: Until 2017

 Brian Dooher: 16 years, until 2011

 Conor Gormley: Until 2014
 David Harte

 Philip Jordan

 Harry Loughran: Until 2021

M
 Enda McGinley
 Brian McGuigan
 Justin McMahon: Until 2017, 110 appearances, with his debut against Fermanagh in the 2007 National League, 40 championship appearances, with his championship debut against Monaghan in the 2007 Ulster SFC final
 Ryan McMenamin: 13 years, until 2012
 Owen Mulligan

N–Z
 Stephen O'Neill: Retired in 2008, then returned until 2014
 Martin Penrose: Until 2014

References

Lists of inter-county Gaelic football players
Players